is a private junior college in Suginami, Tokyo, Japan. The precursor of the school was founded in 1926, and it was chartered as a university in 1966.

External links 
  Official website in Japanese

Private universities and colleges in Japan
Educational institutions established in 1926
Universities and colleges in Tokyo
Japanese junior colleges
Nichiren-shū
1926 establishments in Japan